Peruvian Australians refers to Australian citizens of Peruvian descent or Peru-born person who reside in Australia.

Most Peruvian Australians reside in the state of New South Wales.

Demographics 
According to a census carried in 2016 by Department of Home Affairs, 9,556 Australians were born in Peru, while 11,139 claimed Peruvian ancestry.

The 2016 distribution by State and Territory showed New South Wales had the largest number with 5,714 followed by Victoria (1,416), Queensland (1,128) and Western Australia (685).

History 
The first official record we have of Peruvians in Australia is the census conducted in 1901 when 28 Peruvians were recorded.

Immigration from Peru remained small until the late 1960s when the numbers started to increase slowly. 

Arrivals have continued to rise in the 21st century, with 24.6% of the Peru-born population arriving in Australia between 2007 and 2011.

Notable people
Nathalie Kelley, actress
Mariafe Artacho del Solar, beach volleyballer

See also 

 Hispanic and Latin American Australians

References 

 
Australia
Peruvians